Weston Birch "Bert" Hall (November 7, 1885 – December 6, 1948) was a military aviator and writer. Hall was one of America's first combat aviators, flying with the famed Lafayette Escadrille in France before the U.S. entered World War I.

Biography
Hall was born near Higginsville, Missouri, the son of George Hall.

Bert Hall learned to fly in 1910 at Buc, France, using a "Maurice Farman Biplane Pusher, with a fog-cutter out in front and an air-cooled Renault motor behind." He subsequently acquired a "new 1913 Blériot, equipped with a 60 H.P. Gnome motor", and on February 16, 1913, he along with his French mechanic André Pierce became soldiers of fortune flying for the Sultan of Turkey, for $100 American dollars a day, against the Bulgarians. The first day he was paid in Turkish currency and refused to fly, but received "in gold money" from then on. After two months the Turkish Army payments became inconsistent "fifty dollars one day and sixty the next and forty-five the next", so Bert and André "packed up and flew into Roumania (sic), stopping at Bucharest ... receiving the equivalent of one hundred dollars gold per day in advance.".  After 30 days the Bulgarians welshed, but before Bert and his mechanic could depart with their gold, Bert was arrested, leaving André to bribe the jailers for Bert's release.

After a brief barn storming tour through Ukraine, his Blériot motor quit over the Pyrenees Mountains outside of Tarbes and crashed. He salvaged the motor for 2,500 francs.
In early August 1914, Bert met renowned big game hunter René Philezot and both enlisted as infantry in the French Foreign Legion Deuxiéme (Second) Regiment, which had been redeployed from Morocco to France for trench warfare. In early October, 1914, Bill Thaw, Jimmy Bach, and Bert applied for aviation, and on December 14, 1914, the three entered "into the French Flying Corps."

Bert was one of the seven original members of the Lafayette Escadrille. They included two of the original three applicants—Bill Thaw and Bert Hall, (Jimmy Bach was in the French Flying Corps, but was in a German Prison camp before the LE was organized); Norman (Nimmie) Prince, Frazier Curtiss and Elliot Cowdin joined on March 9, 1914; with the final addition of Raoul Lufbery and Didier Masson. However, he was greatly disliked by his comrades. Besides having an abrasive personality, he was known to be a liar.

Dennis Gordon wrote a book called Autobiographies of the Lafayette Escadrille published by the Doughboy Historical Society - POB 3912 Missoula, MT 59806. According to this book, Bert Hall did get four confirmed kills in the LS and several medals and was the squadron adjutant. But he was a four-flusher, a liar, a deserter and a good poker player who could read his opponents. and usually cleaned the table.

Hall wrote two books about his exploits in the Lafayette Escadrille, En L'air (1918) and One Man's War: The Story of the Lafayette Escadrille (1929). The former was the basis of the 1918 film A Romance of the Air, in which he starred as himself.

In the book One Man's War: The Story of the Lafayette Escadrille, Bert Hall recounts how after he was taken off the front lines due to the mumps, he was to recover in the south of France, versus Paris where he had an apartment and female acquaintances. At the train depot he encountered a wounded soldier who was to recover in Paris, versus the south of France where he was from. So they mutually exchanged their destination "tags", Bert gave him all his cigarettes, and then shook his hand very gently.  In this he admitted that he circumvented the French Army, and that he "always did object to doing things by the numbers anyhow".

He also tells of forcing a German Albatros down in French territory, and contrasts his own personal style versus his mechanic, Leon Mourreau, who also deserved credit as gunner in his early two seat Nieuport: "... my mechanic came in for no small part of this catch, and he deserved it too. But he was a modest fellow, and not nearly as good a talker as I was. Talking up one's exploits had its advantages, even in  a big caliber war.

And finally, Bert Hall persistently refers to his fellow pilots and commanders in glowing and respectful terms, with rare exceptions. And if some were envious and sought to discredit his achievements, he did not reciprocate.

In civilian life, he contracted with the Chinese government to buy surplus planes from the U.S. government and return to China to set up an air service for them, but failed to obtain permission from the State Department. He was charged with violating export restrictions and convicted. Bert Hall was released from McNeil Island Federal Penitentiary in May 1936.  His effort anticipated the July 7, 1937 Second Sino-Japanese War wherein Claire Chennault assessed the Chinese Air Force and received Washington approval of the American Volunteer Group ("Flying Tigers"). Deployment of aircraft, aircrews, and supplies to China began in the spring of 1941.

He lived in Seattle for a few months before heading to Hollywood to work for Twentieth Century Fox studios. Weary of Hollywood, in 1940 he moved to Dayton, Ohio and in 1944 settled in Castalia, Ohio, where he started the Sturdy Toy Factory.

On December 6, 1948, he died of a massive heart attack while driving down the highway near Fremont, Ohio. His ashes were scattered over his hometown of Higginsville, Missouri on January 20, 1950.

Bibliography
Hall wrote books about being a "Flyboy" in the Lafayette Escadrille: 
 Hall, Bert. (1918) En L'air, New York: The New Library, Inc. ASIN: B000M1DSJM
 Hall, Bert. (1929) One Man's War: The Story of the Lafayette Escadrille, London: J. Hamilton. ASIN: B00087AA7I

References

External links

Several photos of Bert Hall and the other real "Flyboys"

Full text of En L'air at the Internet Archive
Cartoon strip Hall of Fame of the Air featuring Hall, by Capt. Eddie Rickenbacker

1885 births
1948 deaths
American World War I pilots
Aviators from Missouri
Lafayette Escadrille
People from Higginsville, Missouri